Raquel Johanna Rosaly Guillermety (born January 13, 1948) is a Puerto Rican actress, singer, and television host.

Early years
Johanna Rosaly was born in Santurce, a district of San Juan. In 1956 at the age of eight, she started taking acting lessons with Argentinians Luis A. Negro and Elba Mania, and dancing lessons with Beatriz Trujillo. In 1957, she made her acting debut as a child, on stage, at Teatro Tapia, in Old San Juan, in  Mientras los Niños Juegan (While the Children Play). That same year, she made her debut on television, with Channel 2's children's production of Los Amigos de Pinocho (Pinocho's Friends) as well as in the film Con Los Pies Descalzos (an Osvaldo Agüero production, starring the Catalan actor Ricardo Palmerola).

Teenage years
She moved to Cancún, Mexico and there Rosaly started taking singing lessons when she became a teenager. Then, she participated on stage in zarzuelas such as El Caserío (The Country House), and Black el Payaso (Black the Clown); operettas, such as La duquesa del Bal Tabarin (The duchess of the Bal Tavern), and musicals performed in English, such as My Fair Lady and The Sound of Music. The latter, allowed her to perform on stage with another Puerto Rican acting legend, Camille Carrión.

In 1966, already in her early years in college, she made her TV debut in the telenovela El Retrato de Angela (Angela's Portrait), broadcast by Telemundo. In this soap opera, she played a mute girl. Later, she married her first husband, Puerto Rican film director José Gilberto Molinari. They procreated 2 sons and a daughter. Alfonsina Molinari is Johanna's daughter and she is an actress and an opera singer.

Singing career
During the 1970s, Johanna Rosaly had a short but notable career as a singer, and she signed with the Velvet Records label, and began touring all over Latin America, to promote her two albums under that label. She also attained considerable fame in Spain. Later, she would sign with CBS International label, now Sony Discos, and recorded two more albums for them.

Television acting career
Rosaly performed in 15 soap operas altogether from 1966 - 1980. However, the leading roles she is mostly remembered for were, 1973's El Hijo de Angela María (The Son of Angela Marie), alongside Rolando Barral, Mona Marti, Ángela Meyer, and Lucy Boscana, among others. This performance led her to carry out the same leading role, Marisela Perdomo, in the film based on the telenovela, in Mexico, opposite Iranian-Mexican actress Irán Eory, and her crossover as a singer and actress was, 1978's Cristina Bazán, opposite José Luis Rodríguez "El Puma", and alongside Alba Nydia Díaz, Esther Sandoval, and Adamari López, at the early age of 6, among others.

In 1979 moved from WKAQ-TV Telemundo Puerto Rico to WAPA-TV. There, she performed the leading role in the 1980 soap operas: Vida, (Life), & Amame, (Love Me), opposite Andrés García, for which she sang the theme songs "Yo Soy un Barco" (I'm a Ship), and "Amándote" (Loving You), respectively.  By 1980, rumors of a romance with world boxing champion Wilfredo Gómez ran across Puerto Rico.

in 1980 she starred in El Amor Nuestro de Cada Día (Our Daily Love), in which she also sang the title song of the same name, composed by Lou Briel.

Anchor woman & TV host
As the 1980s came about, Rosaly made a short parenthesis in her acting career, working as an executive in WAPA-TV, and shortly, moved to Telemundo again, and became an entertainment anchor woman and host in the talk-show, En Vivo a las Cinco, (Live at Five), and in the game show Super Sábados, (Super Saturdays) for several years.

Films
In 1989, she performed alongside Tommy Muñiz in the motion picture film Lo que le Pasó a Santiago, (What really happened to Santiago) produced and directed by Jacobo Morales, which was nominated for an Oscar as the best foreign film.
In 1993 she performed in, Shortcut to Paradise, and in  1994's Linda Sara, (Pretty Sarah) alongside Chayanne and Dayanara Torres.

Recent years
During the 1990s, she was dedicated mostly to act on stage in several theater productions acclaimed by the critics, such as her impersonation of Maria Callas in Master Class, among many others, and since 1993, Johanna's been working for WIPR-TV channel 6, Puerto Rico's Government TV channel, (Tu Universo Televisión), hosting several talk shows, among others, Mucho Gusto (It's a Pleasure).

In 2010, she made her debut on the New York stage, in Sabina y Lucrecia. Rosaly and New York-based actress Eva Cristina Vásquez starred in this play by Alberto Adellach, " a tale of two very different mentally ill women who escape an asylum."

Presently, she hosts ¿Y cómo fué? (And How Was It?), and Cultura Viva, (Alive Culture), alongside Puerto Rican actress Cordelia Gonzalez.  She is also the lead researcher, scriptwriter and narrator of the program, and is credited with its conception.

Rosaly played "Mrs. Warren" in the San Juan revival of La profesión de la Sra. Warren, as part of the International Festival of the Puerto Rican Culture Institute.

Personal life
On January 11, 2008, Rosaly married José Manuel Saldaña, the former president of the University of Puerto Rico. The couple announced their separation in June 2011.

During the 2018 California wildfires, Rosaly was at the residence of her son, film director José Gilberto Molinari, and her daughter in law as well as her two-month old grandchild in Aguora Hills. She escaped the Woolsey Fire with her family by taking refuge in a hotel. Molinari's house only suffered minor damages. A day later, close to the hotel the Rocky Fire started, however, it was soon controlled and the family did not have to flee for a second time.

Honors 
She has received multiple honors, among them, the Puerto Rican Culture Institute (ICP), dedicated their 1997 International Theater Festival to her, honoring her more than 40 years as an actress.

Filmography

Film

Television

See also

List of Puerto Ricans
List of people from San Juan, Puerto Rico
Cristina Bazán
Andrés García
"El Puma"

References

External links

Fundacion Nacional para la Cultura Popular

1948 births
Living people
Actresses from San Juan, Puerto Rico
American television talk show hosts
Puerto Rican film actresses
Puerto Rican soap opera actresses
Puerto Rican stage actresses
Puerto Rican telenovela actresses
Puerto Rican television actresses
Puerto Rican television personalities
20th-century Puerto Rican women singers